Margarita Levchuk (Belarusian Маргарыта Аляксандраўна Ляўчук, Marharyta Liauchuk; born 16 April 1990 in the village of Stradzieč, Brest region, Belarus) is a Belarusian opera singer (soprano). She is a soloist of the Musical House "Classics"; a soloist of the National Opera and Ballet of Belarus; the finalist of the project on the TV channel "Russia-K" "Big Opera" (2017). Levchuk is one of the brightest and most famous opera singers in Belarus.

Musical career 
Levchuk graduated from the Ryhor Shyrma Brest College of Music with a degree in choral conducting. In 2016, she graduated from the Belarusian State Academy of Music.

Since 2012, she has been a soloist of the Musical House "Classics." From 2016 to 2020, she was a soloist at the National Opera and Ballet of Belarus.

Levchuk performs in performances and concerts in Belarus, Russia, Lithuania, Poland, France, and Germany. As a guest artist, she appears on the stages of leading European opera houses.

Administration 
In late 2020, Levchuk was selected as the person responsible for culture and national heritage in National Anti-crisis Management, a shadow government created for Belarus during the 2020 Belarusian protests.

Opera 

 Mozart's "Magic Flute" - Queen of the Night  
 "Rigoletto" Verdi - Gilda 
 "The Wedding of Figaro" by Mozart - Barbarina 
 "La Traviata" by Verdi - Violetta

References

External links 

  // TuzinFM. 11 января 2019.
  // Margarita Levchuk. Soprano. 26 июня 2020.
  // Margarita Levchuk. Soprano. 28 октября 2020.
  // Margarita Levchuk. Soprano. 29 октября 2020.

21st-century women opera singers
Belarusian opera singers
Living people
1990 births